Metridia gerlachei is a copepod found primarily in Antarctic and sub-Antarctic waters.

Description

Distribution
M. gerlachei is found primarily in Antarctic and sub-Antarctic waters, in addition to records from the southern Atlantic, Pacific, and Indian Oceans.

Ecology

Life cycle and reproduction

M. gerlachei may start to reproduce during late winter or early spring and stops during mid-winter (although a more conservative estimate gives from December to April). Breeding peaks in December and January due to the abundance of phytoplankton. It has a relatively low egg production rate of about 6 eggs per day at saturated food concentrations.

Vertical distribution

The population is evenly distributed throughout the water column in autumn and winter. During the day, M. gerlachei is concentrated below . It starts to ascend to the surface when the decrease in light is maximal, reaching the surface a few hours later. The most feeding occurs at this point. The descent starts right after this, and ends when the increase in light reaches its maximum. The population is usually concentrated within  of depth during this diel vertical migration.

Feeding
M. gerlachei is omnivorous, eating mainly phytoplankton, but also copepod eggs, Oncaea curvata, and other animal matter.

Notes and references

Notes

References

Crustaceans described in 1902
Calanoida